German submarine U-407 was a Type VIIC U-boat built for Nazi Germany's Kriegsmarine during World War II.
She was laid down on 12 September 1940 by Danziger Werft, Danzig as yard number 108, launched on 16 August 1941 and commissioned on 18 December 1941 under Oberleutnant zur See Ernst-Ulrich Brüller.

Design
German Type VIIC submarines were preceded by the shorter Type VIIB submarines. U-407 had a displacement of  when at the surface and  while submerged. She had two shafts and two  propellers.

U-407 was fitted with five  torpedo tubes (four fitted at the bow and one at the stern), fourteen torpedoes, one  SK C/35 naval gun, (220 rounds), one  Flak M42 and two  C/30 anti-aircraft guns. The boat had a complement of between forty-four and sixty.

Service history
The boat's career began with training at 5th U-boat Flotilla on 18 December 1941, followed by active service on 1 September 1942 as part of the 9th Flotilla. However, within 3 months, she transferred for operations in the Mediterranean with 29th Flotilla for the remainder of her service.

Wolfpacks
U-407 took part in four wolfpacks, namely:
 Vorwärts (25 August – 26 September 1942)
 Tiger (26 – 28 September 1942)
 Delphin (4 – 10 November 1942)
 Wal (10 – 15 November 1942)

Fate
There were five  crew members killed.

Summary of raiding history

See also
 Mediterranean U-boat Campaign (World War II)

References

Notes

Citations

Bibliography

External links

German Type VIIC submarines
1941 ships
U-boats commissioned in 1941
U-boats sunk in 1944
U-boats sunk by depth charges
U-boats sunk by British warships
U-boats sunk by Polish warships
World War II shipwrecks in the Mediterranean Sea
World War II submarines of Germany
Ships built in Danzig
Maritime incidents in September 1944
Shipwrecks of Greece